Justiniana may refer to:

 Justiniana Prima, a former Byzatine city, near modern Lebane, in Serbia
 Justiniana Secunda, a former Byzatine city, near modern Lipljan, in Kosovo
 Archbishopric of Justiniana Prima, a primatial church province, created in 535

See also
 Justiniana Nova (disambiguation)
 Justinianopolis (disambiguation)